The 1888 United States presidential election in Illinois took place on November 6, 1888, as part of the 1888 United States presidential election. Voters chose 22 representatives, or electors to the Electoral College, who voted for president and vice president.

Illinois voted for the Republican nominee, Benjamin Harrison, over the Democratic nominee, incumbent President Grover Cleveland. Harrison won the state by a narrow margin of 2.96%.

Results

See also
 United States presidential elections in Illinois

References

Illinois
1888
1888 Illinois elections